Scutterfield, Memphis is a community on the northern edge of Memphis, Tennessee, which is a community that lies in the Jackson/Smokey city area. It is one of the 11 communities considering North Memphis.

References 

Neighborhoods in Memphis, Tennessee